Allen Joseph Dickerson is an American attorney who has been a Republican member of the Federal Election Commission since  December 17, 2020.

Education
Dickerson received his undergraduate degree from Yale College and his Juris Doctor from New York University School of Law.

Legal and military career
Dickerson was an Associate with Kirkland & Ellis. He was also the Legal Director at the Institute for Free Speech, where he led a nationwide First Amendment litigation practice. He is currently a Captain in the Judge Advocate General's Corps in the United States Army Reserve. His writings have appeared in a range of publications, including the Harvard Business Law Review, Naval Law Review, Toledo Law Review, Campaigns & Elections, and USA Today.

Appointment to the Federal Election Commission
On June 26, 2020, President Donald Trump announced his intent to nominate Dickerson to serve as a Commissioner of the Federal Election Commission. On September 16, 2020, his nomination was sent to the Senate. President Trump nominated Dickerson to the seat vacated by Caroline C. Hunter, who announced her resignation, effective on July 3, 2020. On December 9, 2020, he was confirmed by the Senate by a vote of 49–47.  He was sworn in on December 17, 2020, with his term as Commissioner expiring on April 30, 2025.

References

External links

Year of birth missing (living people)
Living people
Place of birth missing (living people)
20th-century American lawyers
21st-century American lawyers
United States Army Judge Advocate General's Corps
People associated with Kirkland & Ellis
Members of the Federal Election Commission
New York University School of Law alumni
Yale College alumni